Mikhaylovka is a rural locality (a village) in Skvorchikhinsky Selsoviet, Ishimbaysky District, Bashkortostan, Russia. The population was 3 as of 2010.

Geography 
It is located 28 km from Ishimbay and 10 km from Skvorchikha.

References 

Rural localities in Ishimbaysky District